Kong Ja-young (born July 30, 1985 in Seoul, South Korea) is a female South Korean Judoka. She is a graduate of Yong In University.

She won a silver medal at the Doha Asian Games in 2006 and competed in the Olympics in 2008. She went on to win a bronze medal at the Guangzhou Asian Games and competed in the 2011 World Judo Championships.

As of 2016, Kong works as a policewoman in the Seoul Metropolitan Police Agency, serving Gangseo District.

References

External links
 
 

1985 births
Living people
Judoka at the 2008 Summer Olympics
Olympic judoka of South Korea
Sportspeople from Seoul
Asian Games medalists in judo
Judoka at the 2006 Asian Games
Judoka at the 2010 Asian Games
South Korean female judoka
Asian Games silver medalists for South Korea
Asian Games bronze medalists for South Korea
Yong In University alumni
South Korean police officers
Medalists at the 2006 Asian Games
Medalists at the 2010 Asian Games